Panthea acronyctoides, the black zigzag or tufted spruce caterpillar, is a moth of the family Noctuidae. The species was first described by Francis Walker in 1861. It is found in North America from Newfoundland to British Columbia and adjacent northern states, south in the west to Colorado, south in the east to New England and Kentucky.

The wingspan is 30–35 mm. The moth flies from May to August depending on the location.

The larvae feed on balsam fir, eastern hemlock, eastern larch, pines, and spruces.

Subspecies
There are two recognised subspecies:
Panthea acronyctoides acronyctoides (Walker, 1861)
Panthea acronyctoides nigra Anweiler, 2009

External links

"Revision of the New World Panthea Hübner (Lepidoptera, Noctuidae) with descriptions of 5 new species and 2 new subspecies".

Pantheinae
Moths of North America
Moths described in 1861
Taxa named by Francis Walker (entomologist)